Saccharomycetes belongs to the Ascomycota division of the kingdom Fungi. It is the only class in the subdivision Saccharomycotina, the budding yeasts. Saccharomycetes contains a single order, Saccharomycetales.

Saccharomycetes are known for being able to comprise a monophyletic lineage with a single order of about 1,000 known species. These yeasts live as decomposers, feeding on dead and decaying wood, leaves, litter, and other organic matter. According to Suh et al. (2006), "yeasts are responsible for important industrial and biotechnological processes, including baking, brewing and synthesis of recombinant proteins," with Saccharomycetes being model organisms in research. Asia is likely to be the origin of the source.

References

External links
 Tree of Life: Saccharomycetales

 
Yeasts
Fungus classes
Taxa described in 1997